The E. L. Ehlen Livery and Sale Stable, at 110 First St. in Henderson, Kentucky, was built in 1897.  It was listed on the National Register of Historic Places in 1989.

In 1989 the building was deemed "architecturally and historically significant in the commercial history of Henderson, Kentucky. The property is an unusually good example of turn-of-the-century service businesses architecture of the time. Although not a highly visible Main Street retail establishment, the property's facade displays a pleasing design of brick arch-work within a recessed plane. The property is in good condition and a high degree of integrity has been maintained."

See also 
 John Lair House and Stables: National Register of Historic Places listing in Renfro Valley, Kentucky
 National Register of Historic Places listings in Henderson County, Kentucky

References

National Register of Historic Places in Henderson County, Kentucky

Buildings and structures completed in 1897
1897 establishments in Kentucky
Agricultural buildings and structures on the National Register of Historic Places in Kentucky
Stables in the United States
Equine industry in Kentucky
Henderson, Kentucky